New York's 38th State Assembly district is one of the 150 districts in the New York State Assembly. It has been represented by Jenifer Rajkumar since 2021, defeating Michael G. Miller in the 2020 Democratic primary.

Geography 
District 38 is located in Queens, comprising the neighborhoods of Glendale, Ozone Park, Richmond Hill, Ridgewood, and Woodhaven.

Recent election results

2022

2020

2018

2016

2014

2012

2010

2009 special

References

38